Nathan Deakes (born 17 August 1977 in Geelong) is an Australian former race walker. Deakes trained with the Australian Institute of Sport.

By performances, Deakes is Australia's best and most successful ever race walker, winning several international medals and holding many Australian and World Records. He was the 2006 Australian Male Athlete of the year, Australia's most prestigious sporting award across all sports.

He won a bronze medal at the 2004 Summer Olympics in Athens, and is a four-time Commonwealth Games gold medallist. He won gold in the 20 km walk and 50 km walk events at both the 2002 Manchester Games and the 2006 Melbourne Games, becoming the first man to win both the 20 km and 50 km walks at two consecutive Commonwealth Games. He also won bronze medals at the 1998 Kuala Lumpur Games and the 1996 World Junior Championships. He was also among the leading duo at the Athens Olympics in the 50 km walk, until being disqualified. He won the gold medal at the 2007 World Championships in Osaka in the 50 km walk.

To cap off a successful 2007, Deakes was crowned 2007 Telstra Male Athlete of the Year for the second time (the first being in 2004).

He also broke the 50 km walk world record on 2 December 2006 at the Australian 50 km Road Walking Championships in Geelong, recording a time of 3:35.47. This bettered race walking great Robert Korzeniowski's previous world record of 3:36.03. He is also 4th all-time for the 20 km walk, 1:17.33, and 7th all-time for the 20,000m walk, 1:19.47.

Deakes also won the last edition of the Goodwill Games in Brisbane 2001. He beat a strong field consisting of the current Olympic Champion, Robert Korzeniowski, and the then current World Champion, Roman Rasskazov.

On 21 July 2008 Deakes announced that he would withdraw from the 2008 Summer Olympics in Beijing, with a hamstring tendon injury that required surgery to repair.

His last competitive outing came at the 2012 London Olympics, where he competed despite a year riddled with injury and finished 19th in the 50 km walk. He retired from the sport officially in February 2013, and became a Board Member soon after for Athletics AustraliaIn 2018 he was appointed as a member of the Athletics Integrity Unit Anti-Doping Panel.

Deakes has completed university academic qualifications with a double degree in Banking & Finance and Law (Honours) from the University of Canberra, a Graduate Diploma in Legal Practice from the Australian National University and a Masters in Law with a Sports Law specialisation from the University of Melbourne. He is published in the area of sports integrity.

Inaugural inductee to University of Canberra Sport Walk of Fame in 2022.

References
  
 Nathan Deakes at Australian Athletics Historical Results

External links

 
 
 
 
 

1977 births
Living people
Australian male racewalkers
Sportspeople from Geelong
Olympic athletes of Australia
Commonwealth Games medallists in athletics
Athletes (track and field) at the 2000 Summer Olympics
Athletes (track and field) at the 2004 Summer Olympics
Athletes (track and field) at the 2012 Summer Olympics
Commonwealth Games gold medallists for Australia
Commonwealth Games bronze medallists for Australia
Athletes (track and field) at the 1998 Commonwealth Games
Athletes (track and field) at the 2002 Commonwealth Games
Athletes (track and field) at the 2006 Commonwealth Games
World Athletics Championships medalists
Australian Institute of Sport track and field athletes
World Athletics Championships athletes for Australia
University of Canberra alumni
Australian National University alumni
Medalists at the 2004 Summer Olympics
Olympic bronze medalists for Australia
Olympic bronze medalists in athletics (track and field)
Goodwill Games medalists in athletics
World Athletics Championships winners
Competitors at the 2001 Goodwill Games
People from Redland City
Medallists at the 1998 Commonwealth Games
Medallists at the 2002 Commonwealth Games
Medallists at the 2006 Commonwealth Games